Pridorozhnoye is a rural locality (a selo) in Tambovsky Selsoviet of Tambovsky District, Amur Oblast, Russia. The population was 523 as of 2018. There are 9 streets.

Geography 
Pridorozhnoye is located 13 km southeast of Tambovka (the district's administrative centre) by road. Tambovka is the nearest rural locality.

References 

Rural localities in Tambovsky District, Amur Oblast